George Christopher Garrett (23 December 1908 – 19 January 1969) was an Irish hurler who played as a centre-back for the Cork senior team.

Born in Cork, Garrett first arrived on the inter-county scene at the age of twenty-two when he joined the Cork senior team for the 1931 championship. Garrett went on to play a key role for Cork in what was a decade-long barren spell for the team, and won one All-Ireland medal.

As a member of the Munster inter-provincial team for five years, Garrett won one Railway Cup medal in 1934. At club level he won three successive championship medals with Blackrock.

Throughout his career Garrett made 12 championship appearances. His retirement came following Cork's defeat by Waterford in the 1938 championship.

Honours

Team

Blackrock
Cork Senior Hurling Championship (3): 1929, 1930, 1931

Cork
All-Ireland Senior Hurling Championship (1): 1931
Munster Senior Hurling Championship (1): 1931 (sub)

Munster
Railway Cup (1): 1934

References

1908 births
1969 deaths
Blackrock National Hurling Club hurlers
Cork inter-county hurlers
Munster inter-provincial hurlers
All-Ireland Senior Hurling Championship winners